Tom Lundén  (born March 16, 1950) is a Danish composer and music producer. Lunden was the leader and keyboardist of the flower power rock band Bifrost. His two top hits with Bifrost were Hej Maria (Hello, Maria) and Det er morgen ("It's Morning"). Lundén also wrote the 1976 protest song I kan ikke slå os ihjel (English: "You cannot kill us") as an anthem for the revolutionary hippie commune of Christiania.

See also
List of Danish composers

References

This article was initially translated from the Danish Wikipedia.

Danish composers
Male composers
Danish record producers
1950 births
Living people